Bob, Bobby, Rob, or Robert Collins may refer to:

Academics
Robert O. Collins (1933 – 2008), historian of South Sudan and East Africa
Robert D. Collins (1928–2013), American physician and pathologist

Entertainment
Bob Collins (broadcaster) (1942–2000), American radio broadcaster
Bobby Collins (comedian) (born 1951), American stand-up comedian and film actor
Rob Collins (musician) (1963–1996), English keyboardist in The Charlatans
Rob Collins (actor) (born 1979), Australian actor

Politics
Bob Collins (politician) (1946–2007), Australian Labor Party member of the Australian Senate
Robert A. Collins (1924–2003), American politician
Robert Henry Muirhead Collins (1852–1927), English-born naval officer and Australian public service head
Robert Martin Collins (1843–1913), Queensland politician and grazier

Sports
Bob Collins (footballer, born 1934), Australian rules footballer for Footscray
Bob Collins (footballer, born 1937), Australian rules footballer for Fitzroy
Bobby Collins (footballer) (1931–2014), Scottish footballer
Bobby Collins (American football coach) (born 1933), former American football coach
Bobby Collins (tight end) (born 1976), former tight end in the National Football League
Bobby Collins (basketball) (born 1966), American college basketball coach
Rob Collins (ice hockey) (born 1978), Canadian ice hockey player
Rip Collins (catcher) (Robert Joseph Collins, 1909–1969), backup catcher in Major League Baseball
Robert Collins (rower) (born 1924), retired British rower
 Robert Collins (curler) in competitions such as the Avonair Cash Spiel

Others
Robert Collins (physician) (1800–1868), Irish physician
Robert Collins (British Army officer) (1880–1950), British general
Robert L. Collins (born 1943), writer and director, creator of Police Woman
Robert Frederick Collins (born 1931), U.S. federal judge 
Robert Collins was a lynching victim in Summit, Pike County, Mississippi on June 20, 1922

See also 
 Collins (surname)